Narinder Pal Singh Sawna is an Indian politician and the MLA representing the Fazilka Assembly constituency in the Punjab Legislative Assembly. He is a member of the Aam Aadmi Party.  He was elected as the MLA in the 2022 Punjab Legislative Assembly election. He was earlier in Shiromani Akali Dal and joined AAP in 2021.

Member of Legislative Assembly
He represents the Fazilka Assembly constituency as MLA in Punjab Assembly. The Aam Aadmi Party gained a strong 79% majority in the sixteenth Punjab Legislative Assembly by winning 92 out of 117 seats in the 2022 Punjab Legislative Assembly election. MP Bhagwant Mann was sworn in as Chief Minister on 16 March 2022.

Committee assignments of Punjab Legislative Assembly 
Member (2022–23) Committee on Public Accounts
Member (2022–23) Committee on Questions & References

Electoral performance

References

External links
 

Living people
Punjab, India MLAs 2022–2027
Aam Aadmi Party politicians from Punjab, India
Year of birth missing (living people)